Sidney D. Kirkpatrick (born 1955) is a documentary filmmaker and a bestselling historical author. He grew up in Stony Brook, Long Island and attended Kent School, Connecticut, Hampshire College, Massachusetts and New York University.

His documentaries include:
My Father the President (1982), in which Ethel Derby, second daughter of President Roosevelt, describes her childhood.

His books include:

 A Cast of Killers (pub. 1986),  a non-fiction account of Hollywood director King Vidor's private attempt to solve the William Desmond Taylor murder case.
 Turning the Tide: One Man Against the Medellin Cartel  (with Peter Abrahams), (pub. 1991) a novelized account of a conflict which took place in the Bahamas between drug baron Carlos Lehder and an American professor Richard Novak's investigating hammerhead sharks there.
 Lords of Sipan (pub. 1992), a non-fiction account of the discovery, looting, and eventual recovery by Dr. Walter Alva of artifacts from the tombs in Sipan, Peru.
 Edgar Cayce: An American Prophet (pub. 2000) , a biography of Edgar Cayce, the psychic.
 The Revenge of Thomas Eakins (pub. 2006),  a biography of Thomas Eakins, the artist.
 Hitler's Holy Relics: A True Story of Nazi Plunder and the Race to Recover the Crown Jewels of the Holy Roman Empire (pub. 2010), a true account of art historian-turned-Army sleuth Walter Horn's World War II investigation of Nazi plunder and Germanic mysticism.
 True Tales from the Edgar Cayce Archives (pub. 2015) , Lives Touched and Lessons Learned from the Sleeping Prophet.

Events
The Smithsonian, National Archives, HBO, History Channel, Travel Channel, and A&E Television networks have all featured his work. Biographical profiles of Kirkpatrick have appeared in the New York Times, Newsweek, Time, the New Yorker, and Playboy.

Trivia
Kirkpatrick is the father of Washington Post digital photo editor Nick Kirkpatrick, radio host Alexander Kirkpatrick, and the stepfather of film maker and artist Mercedes Thurlbeck. He plays squash, collects grave rubbings, and rings church bells.

References
Edgarcaycebooks.com

1955 births
Living people
American documentary filmmakers
20th-century American novelists
Kent School alumni
21st-century American historians
21st-century American male writers
20th-century American biographers
American male novelists
20th-century American male writers
American male biographers
American male non-fiction writers